Lessons learned are experiences distilled from a project that should be actively taken into account in future projects.

Lessons learned may also refer to:

Music
 Lessons Learned (album), an album by Tracy Lawrence

Songs
 "Lessons Learned", by Tracy Lawrence from that album 
 "Lessons Learned", from Grand (Matt & Kim album)
 "Lessons Learned",  by Carrie Underwood: 
 On her album Some Hearts
 On Kristin Chenoweth album Some Lessons Learned

Project management
 Military practice:
 The "military lessons of the American Civil War" in Memoirs of General William T. Sherman By Himself (1875)
 U.S. Army Center for Army Lessons Learned (since 1985)
 NATO Joint Analysis and Lessons Learned Centre (since 2002)
 Lessons Learned or lessons learned, postmortem documentation

See also
 Lessons Learned (film)
 "Lesson Learned", a song by Alice in Chains
 Lessons to Be Learned, album by Gabriella Cilmi
 "Lesson Learned", a song by Alicia Keys and John Mayer from As I Am